Roelofje Klazina (Carla) Dik-Faber (born 6 May 1971 in Voorburg) is a Dutch art historian and politician. As a member of the ChristianUnion (ChristenUnie) she has been a Member of Parliament since 20 September 2012. She was a member of the municipal council of Veenendaal from 2003 to 2010 and a member of the States-Provincial of Utrecht from 2007 to 2012.

Carla Dik-Faber studied art history at Utrecht University. She is married and a member of the Netherlands Reformed Churches.

References 
  Parlement.com biography

1971 births
Living people
21st-century Dutch politicians
21st-century Dutch women politicians
Christian Union (Netherlands) politicians
Members of the House of Representatives (Netherlands)
Members of the Provincial Council of Utrecht
Municipal councillors in Utrecht (province)
People from Veenendaal
Netherlands Reformed Churches Christians from the Netherlands
People from Voorburg
Utrecht University alumni